Lennox or Lenox is the surname of:

People

Lennox
 Annie Lennox (born 1954), British singer
 Ari Lennox (born 1991), American singer-songwriter
 Bernard Gordon Lennox (1932–2017), British Army major general
 Betty Lennox (born 1976), American basketball player
 Bobby Lennox (born 1943), British football player
 Caroline Lennox (1723–1774), British nobleowman, later 1st Baroness Holland, eldest of the Lennox sisters
 Charles Lennox (disambiguation)
 Charlotte Lennox (1730–1804), British author
 Dave Lennox (1855–1947), American inventor and businessman
 David Lennox (1788–1873), Australian stonemason and bridge-builder
 Douglas Lennox-Silva (born 1987), Puerto Rican swimmer
 E. J. Lennox (1844–1933), Canadian architect
 Elizabeth Lennox (1894–1992), American contralto singer
 Emily Lennox (1731–1814), British noblewoman, later Duchess of Leinster, one of the Lennox sisters
 Lord George Lennox (1737–1805), British Army general and politician
 Jack Lennox (1907–1943), Australian rugby league player
 John Lennox (born 1943), British mathematician
 Louisa Lennox (1743–1821), British-born Irish noblewoman, one of the Lennox sisters
 Louisa Berkeley, Countess of Berkeley (1694–1716), née Lennox
 Michael Lennox, British film director
 Noah Lennox (born 1978), American musician 
 Lady Sarah Lennox (1745–1826), British noblewoman, one of the Lennox sisters
 Sarah Lennox, Duchess of Richmond (1706–1751), Lady of the Bedchamber to Queen Caroline and mother of the Lennox sisters
 Wilbraham Lennox (1830–1897), British soldier
 William Lennox (disambiguation)

Lenox
 Adriane Lenox, American actress
 Bennie Lenox (1941–2016), American college basketball player and coach
 David Thomas Lenox (1802–1874), American pioneer in Oregon
 Jack Lenox Jr., American World War II flying ace - see List of World War II flying aces
 Michael Lenox (born 1971), American strategist and professor of business administration
 Robert Lenox (1759–1839), Scottish-American merchant
 James Lenox (1800–1880), American bibliophile and philanthropist
 Walter Lenox (1817–1874), mayor of Washington, DC
 Walter Scott Lenox (1859–1920), American founder of Lenox Ceramic Art Company

Fictional characters
 Charles Lenox, an amateur detective featured in Victorian era mystery novels by Charles Finch
 the title character of Susan Lenox (Her Fall and Rise), played by Greta Garbo
 Tabitha Lenox and Timmy Lenox, characters in the American soap opera Passions
 Tom Lennox, the White House Chief of Staff of President Wayne Palmer in the sixth season of the television series 24, played by Peter MacNicol
 William Lennox, in the Transformers film series, played by Josh Duhamel
 William Lennox, villain of the video game Black

See also
 General Lennox (disambiguation)
 Kristina Lennox-Silva (born 1985), Puerto Rican swimmer

Surnames of Scottish origin